Zhao Fu (趙旉; 23 July 1127 – 28 July 1129) was the only son of Emperor Gaozong. He died at the age of two. After his death, his father had no direct male descendants and had to pass the throne to his adopted son.

Life 
On March 26, 1129, Zhao Fu gained his throne to a mutiny that was instigated by the palace guards led by Miao Fu (苗傅) and Liu Zhengyan (劉正彥) then forced Gaozong to abdicate in favor of his one-year-old son Zhao Fu who ruled with the era name Mingshou. Zhao Fu was merely a figure head as Miao, Liu, and the regent the former Empress Meng were the real power behind the throne.

Deposal
On April 20, 1129, Miao and Liu was defeated by Gaozong's loyal army led by Han Shizhong and were both executed for treason. Empress Meng stepped down from the regency and Zhao Fu himself would be forced to abdicate to Emperor Gaozong after having ruled for 25 days.

Death
Zhao Fu suffered a seizure after his deposal and died.

Legacy
Zhao Fu is not usually considered a Song emperor by traditional historians, nor was his era name recognised due to his 25-day reign. His death forced Emperor Gaozong to look for a suitable heir from Emperor Taizu's line as most of Emperor Taizong's descendants were taken in the Jingkang Incident. The mutiny would cause Emperor Gaozong to move his capital to Jiankang.

Footnotes

References

Song dynasty princes
1127 births
1129 deaths
Heirs apparent who never acceded